Ostrów  is a village in the administrative district of Gmina Suraż within Białystok County, Podlaskie Voivodeship, in northeastern Poland.

References

Villages in Białystok County